was a Japanese Buddhist monk, who was born in Hino (now a part of Fushimi, Kyoto) at the turbulent close of the Heian Period and lived during the Kamakura Period. Shinran was a pupil of Hōnen and the founder of what ultimately became the Jōdo Shinshū sect of Japanese Buddhism.

Names
Shinran's birthname was Matsuwakamaro. In accordance with Japanese customs, he has also gone by other names, including Hanen, Shakku and Zenshin, and then finally Shinran, which was derived by combining the names of Seshin (Vasubandhu in Japanese) and Donran (Tanluan’s name in Japanese). His posthumous title was Kenshin Daishi. For a while, Shinran also went by the name Fujii Yoshizane. After he was disrobed, he called himself Gutoku Shinran, in a self-deprecating manner which means "stubble-haired foolish one," to denote his status as "neither a monk, nor a layperson".

Biography 

According to traditional biographies, Shinran was born on May 21, 1173 to Lord and Lady Arinori, from a branch of the Fujiwara clan, and was given the name Matsuwakamaro. Early in Shinran's life his parents both died. In 1181, desperate to know what happens after dying, he entered the Shōren-in temple near present-day Maruyama Park in Kyoto at age nine. Modern historians contest the identity and date of death of Shinran's parents, suggesting he ordained alongside his father due to instability from the Genpei War. He wrote this poem on entering: "Like the cherry blossom, the heart planning on tomorrow is ephemeral indeed—what sudden storm may not arise in the middle of the night". Acutely aware of his own impermanence, he was desperate to find a solution. He then practiced at Mt. Hiei for the next 20 years of his life.  Letters between his wife and daughter indicate that he was a Tendai . 
According to his own account to his wife Eshinni (whose letters are preserved at the Hongan-ji), in frustration at his own failures as a monk and at obtaining enlightenment, he took a retreat at the temple of Rokkaku-dō.  There, while engaged in intense practice, he experienced a vision in which Avalokitesvara appeared to him as Prince Shōtoku, directing Shinran to another disillusioned Tendai monk named Hōnen. In 1201, Shinran met Hōnen and became his disciple. During his first year under Hōnen's guidance, at the age of 29, Shinran attained enlightenment, or salvation through Amida's Vow. Though the two only knew each other for a few years, Hōnen entrusted Shinran with a copy of his secret work, the Senchakushū. However his precise status amongst Hōnen's followers is unclear as in the Seven Article Pledge, signed by Hōnen's followers in 1204, Shinran's signature appears near the middle among less-intimate disciples.
During his time as a disciple of Hōnen's, Shinran caused a great stir among society by publicly getting married and eating meat. Both practices were strictly forbidden for monks, but Shinran took these drastic steps to show that Amida's salvation is for all people and not just for monks and priests.

In 1207, the Buddhist establishment in Kyoto persuaded the military to impose a nembutsu ban, after an incident where two of Hōnen's most prominent followers were accused of using nembutsu practice as a coverup for sexual liaisons. These two monks were subsequently executed. Hōnen and Shinran were exiled, with Shinran being defrocked and sent to Echigo Province (contemporary Niigata Prefecture). They never met each other again. Hōnen would die later in Kyoto in 1212.

Although Shinran was critical of the motivations that ultimately led to the exile, and the disruption of Hōnen's practice community, the exile itself proved to be a critical turning point in Shinran's religious life. Having been stripped of his monastic name, he renamed himself , coming to understand himself as neither monk nor layman. In this period, aristocratic exiles were provided land and seed and were required to take up farming, a measure designed to humiliate and humble them, which brought Shinran into the company of many of the lower social classes. While in exile, Shinran sought to continue the work of Hōnen and spread the doctrine of salvation through Amida Buddha's compassion, as expressed through the nembutsu practice, however in time his teachings diverged from Hōnen enough that later followers would use the term Jōdo Shinshū or "True Essence of the Pure Land Sect", as opposed to Jōdo-shū or "Pure Land Sect".

Shinran married his wife, Eshinni, and had seven children with her.

Five years after being exiled in Echigo, in 1211, the nembutsu ban was lifted and Shinran was pardoned though he chose not to return to Kyoto at that time.  Instead, Shinran left for an area known as Inada, a small area in Kantō just north of Tokyo. In 1224 Shinran authored his most significant text, Kyogyoshinsho, which is a series of selections and commentaries on Buddhist sutras supporting the new Pure Land Buddhist movement, and establishing a doctrinal lineage with Buddhist thinkers in India and China. In 1234 Shinran left the Kantō area and returned to Kyoto, with his daughter Kakushinni. On returning to Kyoto, Shinran discovered that his eldest son, Zenran (善鸞 1217?–1286?), who remained in Hitachi and Shimotsuke provinces was telling people he received special teachings from Shinran and was otherwise leading people astray. Shinran wrote stern letters to Zenran (frequently addressed by his Buddhist name ) instructing him to cease his activities, but when Zenran refused, Shinran disowned him:

Shinran died in Kyoto the year 1263 at the age of 90.  Kakushinni was instrumental in maintaining the mausoleum, and passing on his teachings, with her descendants ultimately becoming the Monshu, or head of the Honganji Temples built around the Mausoleum.

Timeline

 1173: Shinran is born
 1175: Hōnen founds the Jōdo-shū sect
 1181: Shinran becomes a monk
 1201: Shinran becomes a disciple of Hōnen and leaves Mt. Hiei
 1207: The nembutsu ban and Shinran's exile
 1211: Shinran is pardoned
 1212: Hōnen passes away in Kyoto & Shinran goes to Kantō
 1224(?): Shinran authors Kyogyoshinsho
 1234(?): Shinran goes back to Kyoto
 1256: Shinran disowns his son Zenran
 1263: Shinran dies in Kyoto

Doctrine 
Shinran considered himself a lifelong disciple of Hōnen, in spite of their separation.  According to a letter composed by his wife, Eshinni:

Hōnen's disciples were said to have been largely divided by questions arising from the need for a single invocation (nenbutsu) of Amitabha's name versus many-callings, and thereby emphasis on faith versus practice.  Shinran, like Hōnen's disciple Kōsai, leaned more toward faith over practice, however he did not advocate the single-recitation teaching.

While Shinran's teachings and beliefs were generally consistent with the Pure Land Buddhist movement at the time, he also had idiosyncrasies as well:

Primacy of faith 

In any case Shinran, like others in Hōnen's community, felt that in the age of Dharma Decline, it was no longer possible to achieve enlightenment through traditional monastic practices, and thus one could only rely on the vows of Amitabha Buddha, particular the 18th or "Primal Vow" and seek rebirth in the Pure Land.  In a passage from his magnum opus, the Kyōgyōshinshō, he writes of himself:

In this passage, Shinran explains that he not only gave up traditional monastic practices to focus on rebirth in the Pure Land, but that in time he eventually gave up on practices related to rebirth in the Pure Land, instead relying solely on faith in the vow of Amitabha Buddha.

Through this endowment, faith is awakened in a person, and the recitation of the Buddha's name or nembutsu because an expression of praise or gratitude. However, this cannot occur until the believer fully entrusts themselves to Amitabha Buddha, even for a moment. Once this state of faith is bestowed, one is assured of rebirth in the Pure Land, and ultimately enlightenment. Shinran cautions though:

Further, once a follower has awakened to this deep faith, one should live life as an expression of gratitude, follow moral conduct and fulfill one's social obligations. As one's faith in Amida deepens, Shinran articulated ten spiritual benefits that develop: Protected by unseen divine beings (myoshu goji), Possessed of the supreme virtue (shitoku gusoku), Having evil turned into good (tenaku jyozen), Protected by all Buddhas (shobutsu gonen), Praised by all Buddhas (shobutsu shyosan), Protected by the Buddha's spiritual light (shinko jogo), Having much joy in mind (shinta kangi), Acknowledging His benevolence and repaying it (chion hotoku), Always practicing the Great Compassion (jyogyo daihi), Entering the Rightly-Established Group (shojyoju ni iru).

Amitabha Buddha and the Pure Land 

The last three fascicles of the Kyōgyōshinshō delve into the nature of Amitabha Buddha and the Pure Land. The Pure Land is treated as a temporary refuge whereby one can attain enlightenment, and then return to this world to lead and teach others as a bodhisattva.

On the nature of Amitabha Buddha, Shinran stated that in their true form, both the Buddha and the Pure Land are beyond comprehension, but due to people's ignorance and attachments they can only perceive Amitabha in terms of his physical form described in the sutras, as well as the layout of the Pure Land.  If one attains true faith, then upon rebirth in the Pure Land, one can perceive their true form.  However, if one's faith is incomplete, or they continue to rely on their own efforts, then they will be reborn in the outer regions of the Pure Land, and will still perceive Amitabha Buddha through physical forms until eventually attaining true faith and proceeding further.

Shinran's definition of Amitabha Buddha as the absolute, equating the Pure Land with Nirvana itself, therefore differed somewhat from traditional interpretations of the Pure Land in Buddhist scripture.

Age of Dharma decline 

Shinran's interpretation of the final age of the Dharma, was consistent with other Buddhist thinkers of the time.  In particular, he drew inspiration from a Chinese Buddhist master named Tao-cho who centuries earlier taught that in the latter age of the Dharma the Pure Land teachings were the most suitable for the capacities of the people of the time.

Shinran felt that this decline was inevitable, that Japan was already 600 years into age of Dharma Decline, and that people were no longer capable of maintaining Buddhist practice, let alone enlightenment.  Thus, only the vow of Amitabha Buddha to save all beings could be relied upon.

Other religious practices 

Shinran acknowledged the religious practices of Japan outside the Buddhist tradition, including Shinto kami, spirits, divination, astrology, etc., he believed that they were irrelevant in comparison to the power of Amitabha Buddha. He developed a Japanese Buddhist heresiology that constructed other forms of religious practice as equivalent to demon-worship; his followers would later use this equivocation both to enforce proper interpretations of Shinran's thought and to criticize "heretical" sects of Buddhism such as the Tachikawa-ryu. To this day, omamori, ofuda and other charms are not found in Jodo Shinshu temples.

Statue 

A statue of Shinran Shonin stands in Upper West Side Manhattan, in New York City on Riverside Drive between 105th and 106th Streets, in front of the New York Buddhist Church. The statue depicts Shinran in a peasant hat and sandals, holding a wooden staff, as he peers down at the sidewalk.

Although this kind of statue is very common and often found at Jōdo Shinshū temples, this particular statue is notable because it survived the atomic bombing of Hiroshima, standing a little more than a mile from ground zero. It was brought to New York in 1955. The plaque calls the statue "a testimonial to the atomic bomb devastation and a symbol of lasting hope for world peace."

Ashes

On March 14, 2008, what are assumed to be some of the ash remains of Shinran were found in a small wooden statue at the Jōrakuji temple in Shimogyō-ku, Kyōto. The temple was created by Zonkaku (1290–1373), the son of Kakunyo (1270–1351), one of Shinran's great grandchildren. Records indicate that Zonkaku inherited the remains of Shinran from Kakunyo. The 24.2 cm wooden statue is identified as being from the middle of the Edo period. The remains were wrapped in paper.

See also 
 Faith in Buddhism
 Jōdo Shinshū
 Statue of Shinran, Tokyo

Notes

Further reading
Bloom, Alfred: The Essential Shinran: A Buddhist Path of True Entrusting, (World Wisdom) 2007. 
Ducor, Jerome : Shinran, Un réformateur bouddhiste dans le Japon médiéval (col. Le Maître et le disciple); Gollion, Infolio éditions, 2008
Albert Shansky: Shinran and Eshinni: A Tale of Love in Buddhist Medieval Japan,  (10),  (13)
 Dobbins, James C. (1989). Jodo Shinshu: Shin Buddhism in Medieval Japan. Bloomington, Illinois: Indiana University Press. ;  OCLC 470742039
 Dobbins, James C. (1990). "The Biography of Shinran: Apotheosis of a Japanese Buddhist Visionary", History of  Religions 30 (2), 179–196 
Kenneth Doo Young Lee: "The Prince and the Monk: Shotoku Worship in Shinran's Buddhism", 
Kokubu, Keiji. Pauro to Shinran (Paul and Shinran). Kyoto: Hozokan, 1984. (This comparative study written in Japanese.)
Shigaraki, Takamaro: A Life of Awakening: The Heart of the Shin Buddhist Path.  Translation by David Matsumoto. Hozokan Publishing, Kyoto, 2005
Shinran Shonin, Hisao Inagaki (trans): Kyōgyōshinshō: On Teaching, Practice, Faith, and Enlightenment, Berkeley: Numata Center for Buddhist Translation and Research, 2003. 
Takamori, Kentetsu; Akehashi, Daiji; Ito, Kentaro: "You Were Born for a Reason: The Real Purpose Of Life (Ichimannendo Publishing, Inc. 2006) 
Takamori, Kentetsu: Unlocking Tannisho: Shinran's Words on the Pure Land Path (Ichimannendo Publishing, Inc 2011) 
Ueda, Yoshifumi, and Hirota, Dennis: Shinran: An Introduction to His Thought. With Selections from the Shin Buddhism Translation Series. (Kyoto: Hongwanji International Center, 1989.)
 S. Yamabe and L. Adams Beck (trans).  Buddhist Psalms of Shinran Shonin, London: John Murray 1921 (e-book)
 Sokusui Murakami (2001). "Joy of Shinran: Rethinking the Traditional Shinshu Views on the Concept of the Stage of Truly Settled", Pacific World Journal'', Third Series, Number 3, 5-25. Archived from the original

External links

 
 
 The Collected Works of Shinran
 Commentary on Shinran's Wasan (Hymns) in Three Volumes
 Homepage for Jodo Shinshu Hongwanji-ha Hongwanji International Center 

 
1173 births
1263 deaths
Japanese Buddhist clergy
Jōdo Shinshū
Pure Land Buddhism
Recipients of Japanese royal pardons

Founders of Buddhist sects
Kamakura period Buddhist clergy